The 2020 Murray State Racers football team represented Murray State University in the 2020–21 NCAA Division I FCS football season. They were led by Dean Hood in his first season as the program's 19th head coach. The Racers played their home games at Roy Stewart Stadium. They competed as a member of the Ohio Valley Conference.

Previous season

The Racers finished the 2019 season 4–8, 2–6 in OVC play to finish in a tie for seventh place. After the season, head coach Mitch Stewart was reassigned to a new position within the athletic department after compiling a record of 19–37 over five seasons. On December 13, 2019, Dean Hood was named as the team's new head coach.

Schedule
Murray State had games scheduled against Louisville and Tarleton State, which were canceled due to the COVID-19 pandemic.

References

Murray State
Murray State Racers football seasons
Murray State Racers football